Byun Hyuk (born January 1, 1966), also known as Daniel H. Byun, is a South Korean film director and screenwriter. He graduated from La Fémis in 1997.

Best known for his working on his film debut Interview (2000) using the Dogme 95 movement, being the first Asian film to do so.

Filmography
 Homo Videocus (short film) (1990)
 Interview (Dogme # 7) (2000)
 The Scarlet Letter (2004)
 Five Senses of Eros (segment "His Concern") (2009)
 High Society (2018)

References

External links
 
 Byun Hyuk at HanCinema

1966 births
Living people
South Korean film directors
South Korean screenwriters